PGHS may refer to:
 Pacific Grove High School, Pacific Grove, California, United States
 Palmers Green High School, Palmers Green, London, United States
 Penns Grove High School, Carneys Point, New Jersey, United States
 Palmers Green High School, Pinetown, KwaZulu-Natal, South Africa
 Pleasant Grove High School (California), Elk Grove, California, United States
 Pleasant Grove High School (Utah), Pleasant Grove, Utah, United States
 Pottsgrove High School, Pottsgrove, Pennsylvania, United States
 Prairie Grove High School, Prairie Grove, Arkansas, United States
 Prince George High School, Prince George, Virginia, United States
Providence Grove High School, North Carolina, United States